Jung Sung-hwa (born January 2, 1975) is a South Korean actor. He is best known in musical theatre, and has starred in Korean productions of Man of La Mancha and Les Misérables.

Filmography

Film

Television Series

Hosting

Theater

Awards and nominations

References

External links

 
 

1975 births
Living people
South Korean male television actors
South Korean male film actors
South Korean male musical theatre actors
20th-century South Korean male actors
21st-century South Korean male actors
Seoul Institute of the Arts alumni
People from Incheon